John Capel (31 October 1767- December 1846) was a British politician who served as the Tory Member of Parliament for Queenborough from the 10 June 1826 to 3 December 1832 where the Great Reform Act abolished the constituency.

He is buried with his first wife and their younger daughter in the vault of St. John’s, Regent’s Park, Middlesex.

Other work 
Capel served as the Governor of the Foundling Hospital between 1791 to 1832 when he became the Vice-President until his death.

References 

1767 births
1846 deaths
Foundling Hospital
UK MPs 1924–1929
UK MPs 1929–1931
UK MPs 1931–1935
Tory members of the Parliament of the United Kingdom